Kathryn Stripling Byer (November 25, 1944 – June 5, 2017), also called Kay Byer, was an American poet and teacher. She was named by Governor Mike Easley as the fifth North Carolina Poet Laureate from 2005 to 2009. She was the first woman to hold the position.

Biography

Early life and education
Kathryn Stripling was born in Camilla, Georgia in 1944. Her parents were C.M. Stripling, a farmer, and his wife, Bernice (née Campbell) Stripling.

She went on to graduate with a bachelors in English from Macon, Georgia's Wesleyan College and then received her M.F.A. from the University of North Carolina at Greensboro, where she studied under Allen Tate, Fred Chappell, and Robert W. Watson. During this time at UNC-G, Byer decided to move to the mountains of North Carolina.

Career
After receiving her M.F.A., Byer became poet-in-residence at Western Carolina University, 1988–98, as well as UNC-G in 1995 and Lenoir-Rhyne College in 1999. She has published six full collections of poetry as well as some chapbooks. Her most recent collection is Descent published in 2012 by Louisiana State University Press.

Poet laureateship
In 2005, North Carolina Governor Michael Easley appointed Byer to be the state's fifth poet laureate following Fred Chappell whose term ended in 2002. She was the first woman to hold the position.

As part of her outreach program during her term as poet laureate, Byer maintained "My Laureate's Lasso", a blog that focused on North Carolina poets and poetry. She was also the judge for the North Carolina Poetry Society's Poet Laureate Award. In 2008, Byer named Katherine Indermaur as the first North Carolina Student Poet Laureate.

Personal life
Kathryn Stripling Byer was married to Western Carolina University professor Jim Byer. They had one daughter and last lived in Cullowhee, North Carolina.

Death
Kathryn Stripling  Byer died at the age of 72 in Cullowhee on June 5, 2017, from lymphoma.

Works
Some of Byer's poetry appeared in, among other periodicals, The Carolina Quarterly, The Georgia Review, The Hudson Review, The Iowa Review, Poetry, and The Southern Review. Her work often dealt with lives and hardships of western North Carolina mountain inhabitants, especially women, in earlier generations.

Books
Byer's books include:
 The Girl in the Midst of the Harvest (1986), Associated Writing Programs award series
 Wildwood Flower (1992) 
 Black Shawl (1998)
 Catching Light (Louisiana State University Press, 2002)
 Wake (chapbook, 2003)
 Coming to Rest (Louisiana State University Press, 2006)
 The Movable Nest: A Mother/Daughter Companion as co-editor with Kallet, Marilyn (Helicon Nine Editions, 2007)
 Southern Fictions (sonnet chapbook; Jacar Press, 2011)
 Descent (Louisiana State University Press, 2012)

Essays
Some of Byer's most notable essays include:
 "Turning the Windlass at the Well: Fred Chappell's Early Poetry" in Dream Garden: The Poetic Vision of Fred Chappell (1997)
 "Deep Water" in Bloodroot: Reflections on Place by Appalachian Women Writers (1998)

Awards and honors
 1992 – Lamont Poetry Selection of the Academy of American Poets
 1998 – Roanoke-Chowan Award for Poetry
 2001 – Emory and Henry College's Kathryn Stripling Byer Literary Festival
 2001 – North Carolina Award in Literature
 2003 – SIBA Book Award in Poetry for Catching Light
 2005–2009 – North Carolina Poet Laureate 
 2012 – inducted into the North Carolina Literary Hall of Fame
 2013 – SIBA Book Award in Poetry for Descent

References

External links
 
 Here Where I Am Blog

1944 births
2017 deaths
Poets Laureate of North Carolina
Poets from North Carolina
People from Camilla, Georgia
People from Jackson County, North Carolina
University of North Carolina at Greensboro alumni
Wesleyan College alumni
Western Carolina University faculty
American women poets
20th-century American poets
20th-century American women writers
21st-century American poets
21st-century American women writers
Poets from Georgia (U.S. state)
Deaths from lymphoma
Deaths from cancer in North Carolina
American women academics